The Vicksburg-Warren School District (VWSD) is a public school district based in Vicksburg, Mississippi United States. The district's boundaries parallel that of Warren County.

In 1987 the Vicksburg city school district and the Warren County school district combined into a single district.

Schools

High schools
Vicksburg High School
1988-1989 National Blue Ribbon School
Warren Central High School
River City Early College

Junior high schools
Vicksburg Junior High School
Warren Central Junior High School
Academy of Innovation

Elementary schools
Beechwood Elementary School
Bovina Elementary School
Bowmar Avenue Magnet School
Dana Road Elementary School
Redwood Elementary School
Sherman Avenue Elementary School
South Park Elementary School
Warrenton Elementary School
Vicksburg Intermediate School
Warren Central Intermediate School

Former schools
Hall's Ferry Road Elementary School
1985-1986 National Blue Ribbon School
Culkin Elementary School
Jett Elementary School
Cedars Elementary School
Vicksburg Middle School
H. V. Cooper High School
Rosa A. Temple High School
Carr Central High School
Carr Central Junior High School

Demographics

2006-07 school year
There were a total of 9,048 students enrolled in the Vicksburg-Warren School District during the 2006–2007 school year. The gender makeup of the district was 50% female and 50% male. The racial makeup of the district was 60.97% African American, 36.83% White, 1.37% Hispanic, 0.74% Asian, and 0.09% Native American. 59.9% of the district's students were eligible to receive free lunch.

Previous school years

Accountability statistics

See also
List of school districts in Mississippi

References

External links
 

Education in Warren County, Mississippi
School districts in Mississippi
1987 establishments in Mississippi
School districts established in 1987
Vicksburg, Mississippi